Kalateh-ye Mian (also Romanized as Kalāteh-ye Mīān) is a village in Chenaran Rural District, in the Central District of Chenaran County, Razavi Khorasan Province, Iran. At the 2006 census, its population was 64, in 19 families.

References 

Populated places in Chenaran County